Heydi Rachel Reyes Martínez (born 17 June 2001) is a Honduran footballer who plays as a midfielder for the Honduras women's national team.

International career
Reyes capped for Honduras at senior level during the 2020 CONCACAF Women's Olympic Qualifying Championship qualification.

References

2001 births
Living people
Honduran women's footballers
Women's association football midfielders
Honduras women's international footballers